Matthew Walker Smaby (born October 14, 1984) is an American former professional ice hockey defenseman. He last played with EHC Red Bull München of the Deutsche Eishockey Liga (DEL). As of 2021, he is the head coach of the Waterloo Black Hawks, a Tier I junior team in the United States Hockey League.

Career
Smaby was drafted 41st overall in the 2003 NHL Entry Draft by the Tampa Bay Lightning. Smaby had a three-year collegiate career with the University of North Dakota. He made his professional debut during the 2006–07 season playing for the Springfield Falcons of the American Hockey League (AHL). Smaby made his National Hockey League (NHL) debut in the 2007–08 season playing 14 games with the Lightning.

Smaby played five years with the Tampa Bay Lightning organization. He did not receive a qualifying offer from Tampa Bay after the 2010–11 season and became an unrestricted free agent. On July 14, 2011, Smaby signed a one-year contract with the Anaheim Ducks.

On June 6, 2013, Smaby signed his first European contract on a one-year deal with EHC München of the German Deutsche Eishockey Liga (DEL). Prior to the 2014–15 season, Smaby signed a professional tryout contract with the Arizona Coyotes but was released on October 4, 2014, and returned to EHC München. In 2015, München extended Smaby's contract though the 2016–17 season.

Smaby retired from playing in 2017 and returned to the University of North Dakota to earn his degree while rejoining his collegiate team, the University of North Dakota Fighting Hawks, as team manager. After earning his degree in 2019, he returned to Europe as an assistant coach with EC Red Bull Salzburg of Erste Bank Eishockey Liga (EBEL). Due to the COVID-19 pandemic, Smaby returned to the United States in 2020 and coached youth hockey in Grand Forks, North Dakota. On July 27, 2021, he was hired as the head coach of the Waterloo Black Hawks, a Tier I junior team in the United States Hockey League (USHL).

Career statistics

Awards and honors

References

External links

1984 births
Living people
American men's ice hockey defensemen
EHC München players
Norfolk Admirals players
Springfield Falcons players
Syracuse Crunch players
Tampa Bay Lightning draft picks
Tampa Bay Lightning players
North Dakota Fighting Hawks men's ice hockey players
Ice hockey people from Minneapolis
Sports coaches from Minneapolis